The Mine is a rural locality in the Rockhampton Region, Queensland, Australia.

Education 
There are no schools in The Mine. The nearest government primary and secondary schools are Mount Morgan State School and Mount Morgan State High School, both in neighbouring Mount Morgan to the east.

References 

Suburbs of Rockhampton Region
Localities in Queensland